Sylvain Schnaittacher (1874-1926) was an American architect.

He served as director and as president of the American Institute of Architects chapter in San Francisco, and then during 1918-20 he served as the Western States regional director.

He was born in San Francisco.  He trained in the office of architect A. Page Brown during 1891-96.  He partnered with Frank Van Trees.

Among other works, he designed the Paige Motor Car Co. Building (1919–22), at 1699 Van Ness Ave. in San Francisco, California, which is listed on the National Register of Historic Places.

Works include:
Paige Motor Car Company Building (1919, 1922)
Argonaut Club
Beresford Country Club
Mt. Zion Nurses' Home on Sutter in San Francisco
Temple Emanu-El, in cooperation with Bakewell & Brown, who finished the project after Schnaittacher's death.
869-883 Geary Street, (1922, Spanish Colonial Revival commercial building, a contributing building in the Uptown Tenderloin Historic District listed on the National Register of Historic Places)

References

Architects from California